The KBF Premier League is the premier basketball league for clubs in Kenya. The league consist out of twelve teams. The most successful team in the history of the league is KPA with five national championships.

The champions of the KBF Premier League are eligible to play in the qualifying rounds of the Basketball Africa League (BAL).

Current teams 
The following were the twelve teams for the 2019 season:
KPA
Ulinzi Warriors
Nairobi City Thunder
Equity Bank
Emyba
Strathmore
Eldonets
Lakerside
KCA U
Umoja
USIU Tigers
World Hope

Champions

Most Valuable Player
2021–22: Kennedy Wachira (KPA)

References

External links
Kenya at AfroBasket.com

Basketball in Kenya
Basketball leagues in Africa
Sports leagues in Kenya